Toba language may refer to:

 Toba Batak language, an Austronesian language spoken in North Sumatra province in Indonesia
 Toba-Maskoy language, a Mascoian language, one of several languages of the Paraguayan Chaco called Toba
 Toba Qom language, a Guaicuruan language spoken in Argentina, Paraguay, and Bolivia by the Toba people
 Pilagá language (Pilaca), a Guaicuruan language spoken in western Formosa Province in northeastern Argentina